Dr. Dharam Singh Saini  is an Indian politician and is a member of the 14th, 15th, 16th and the Seventeenth Legislative Assembly of Uttar Pradesh of India. Dr. Saini represents the Nakur constituency of Uttar Pradesh and is a member of the Samajwadi Party political party.

Early life and education
Dr Dharam Singh Saini was born in village Sona in the state of Uttar Pradesh. He attained Gurukul Ayurved Mahavidyalaya, Jwalapur, Haridwar (now Uttarakhand Ayurved University - Gurukul Campus, Haridwar) and earned B.A.M.S degree and is a practicing Ayurveda physician.

Political career
Dr Saini has been a MLA for three straight terms. During the 14th and 15th Legislative Assembly of Uttar Pradesh he represented the Sarsawa assembly constituency of Uttar Pradesh. During the 15th Legislative Assembly, he was also a minister. He got the ministries of Ayush, Relief and Rehabilitation.

Posts Held

See also
Politics of India
Uttar Pradesh Legislative Assembly

References

1961 births
Living people
People from Uttar Pradesh
Former members of Bahujan Samaj Party
Uttar Pradesh MLAs 2017–2022
Former members of Bharatiya Janata Party from Uttar Pradesh
Uttar Pradesh MLAs 2002–2007
Yogi ministry